Daphnia sinevi is a species of water fleas from the Russian Far East.

Description

Distribution and taxonomy
Daphnia sinevi is only known from a single pool,  in diameter at Avangard, near Nakhodka, Primorsky Krai, Russia. It was collected there in 2004 by A. Y. Sinev, and described in 2006 in the Journal of Plankton Research. The holotype, along with an allotype and a series of paratypes are held at the Zoological Museum of Moscow State University. The closest relatives of D. sinevi are other species in the species group around D. curvirostris, especially Daphnia morsei.

References

Cladocera
Freshwater crustaceans of Asia
Endemic fauna of Russia
Crustaceans described in 2006